NGC 2349 is an open cluster of stars in the Monoceros constellation. It was discovered by Caroline Herschel in 1783.

References

External links
 NGC 2349 @ SEDS NGC objects pages
 

Monoceros (constellation)
2349
Open clusters